The Philippines women's national under-20 football team is the national football team of the Philippines and represents in international football competitions such as AFF U-19 Women's Championship and any other under-20 international football tournaments. The team is controlled by the Philippine Football Federation (PFF), the governing body of football in the Philippines.

Results and fixtures
Legend

2022

2023

Personnel
Updated as of March 3, 2023

Current technical staff

Management

Coaching history

Players
Caps and goals updated as of 12 March 2023, after the match against .

Recent call-ups

The following players have been called up for the Philippines U-20 within the past 12 months.

Competitive record
FIFA U-20 Women's World Cup
The Philippines has never qualified for the FIFA U-20 Women's World Cup. It didn't attempt to qualify for the inaugural FIFA U-19 Women's World Cup in 2002 with its non-participation at the 2002 AFC U-19 Women's Championship which also served as the Asian qualifiers of the U-20 World Cup. The national team first attempted to qualify for the succeeding editions of the tournament from 2004.*Draws include knockout matches decided on penalty kicks.AFC U-20 Women's Asian Cup
The has competed in one edition of the AFC U-20 Women's Asian Cup, the top tournament for women's national teams under the age of 20, organized by members of the Asian Football Confederation. The Philippines first competed in 2004, when the tournament was still known as the "AFC U-19 Women's Championship".

AFF U-19 Women's Championship

Head-to-head record
, after the match against ''.

See also
 Football in the Philippines

Women's
 Philippines women's national football team

Men's
 Philippines national football team
 Philippines national under-23 football team
 Philippines national under-21 football team
 Philippines national under-19 football team
 Philippines national under-17 football team

External links
 Philippine Football Federation

References

Asian women's national under-20 association football teams
under-20
U-20